Scott Sharp (born February 14, 1968) is an American professional racing driver in the United SportsCar Championship. He is the son of six-time SCCA champion Bob Sharp. Sharp is best known for his years as a competitor in the Indy Racing League.

Early career
Born in Norwalk, Connecticut, Sharp starting racing karts when he was eight years old, winning 50 out of 75 races. Sharp came from a road-racing background, earning several championships including championships in the 1986 SCCA GT-2, 1987 and 1988 SCCA GT-1, and 1991 and 1993 SCCA Trans-Am classes. Sharp competed in one NASCAR Winston Cup Series event, coming in 1992 at Watkins Glen. In 1993, Sharp made his CART debut with Bettenhausen Motorsports and became a full-time competitor in the series in 1994 with PacWest Racing. His first Indianapolis 500 start also came in 1994. In 1996, Sharp was part of Doyle Racing’s 24 Hours of Daytona winning team.

Indy Racing League career

Overview
Sharp is one of only two drivers (the other being Buddy Lazier) to have driven in at least one race in each of the first 12 seasons of IndyCar competition (1996 to 2008). His impressive IRL career has resulted in numerous records for that time period including: most career IndyCar Series starts (147); most consecutive IndyCar Series race starts (138); most races running at finish (110) and previously held the records for most top-ten finishes (82) and most consecutive seasons with at least one race win (7) (since broken by Hélio Castroneves).

History
Sharp was a competitor in the first IRL race in 1996, driving for A. J. Foyt Enterprises. He was the co-champion of the IRL's inaugural season in 1996 along with Buzz Calkins.
In 1997 two crashes resulting in severe concussions sidelined Sharp until 1998 when he began working with the newly formed Kelley Racing team and sponsor Delphi.  At Kelley, Sharp collected eight wins and four pole positions (one being at the 2001 Indianapolis 500). He was 3rd in the championship in 2001, but an influx of strong teams from CART meant that Kelley was not one of the strongest teams after that season. In 2004 he was down in 13th in the championship with a best finish of 8th — his first winless season since 1998, also ending a run of top 8 championship finishes dating back to 1998.

Kelley Racing folded following the conclusion of the 2004 season. In 2005, Sharp, along with Delphi, who had become his personal sponsor, moved to Fernández Racing. The switch brought about a small resurgence in Sharp's career and he was once again one of the top drivers in the IRL. 2005 saw him finish 5th in the championship, collecting a win at Kentucky Speedway along the way. However, Sharp struggled through the 2006 season as the team struggled to adapt to the Dallara chassis, and finished 11th in the points standings.

For 2007, Sharp joined Rahal Letterman Racing, teaming with sophomore driver Jeff Simmons. Mid-season, Simmons was replaced with Ryan Hunter-Reay. Sharp brought with him a new primary sponsor, the Patrón Spirits Company, who began as an associate sponsor in 2006. His new association with Patrón ended nine seasons of backing from Delphi. His best finish of the season was 3rd, which he earned at the season opener at Iowa Speedway and at Michigan International Speedway. A highlight of the season was his surprise pole position at Texas Motor Speedway in June, his first pole since 2001. He was also able to capture a career-best 6th place in the Indianapolis 500. Sharp ended the season 8th in the championship.

Sharp returned to the series and competed in the 2009 Indianapolis 500 with Panther Racing. He qualified 20th and finished the race 14th on the lead lap.

American Le Mans Series career

Sharp was under contract with Rahal Letterman Racing for 2008, but the two entities parted ways after each filed a breach of contract lawsuit against the other. Sharp and Patrón joined the American Le Mans Series with Highcroft Racing. He drove the #9 Patrón Highcroft Racing Acura ARX-01b with David Brabham during the 2008 season in the LMP2 class.

Sharp started seventh in his debut in the Mobil 1 Twelve Hours of Sebring and finished fourth in his class (fifth overall) with his teammates Brabham and Stefan Johansson.  The team finished second at the Acura Sports Car Challenge of St. Petersburg, which was Highcroft’s best finish to date. Sharp earned his first ALMS win in the P2 class at the Tequila Patron American Le Mans Series at Long Beach. The win was also the first for Highcroft Racing. Sharp earned his first overall win in the American Le Mans Series at the 2008 Northeast Grand Prix at Lime Rock Park after starting from the pole position. A third class victory followed at the Generac 500 at Road America. When leader Gil de Ferran ran out of fuel on the last lap in Mosport awarded the team a fourth victory and second consecutive win.

Arguably, Sharp’s breakout ALMS performance came at the Detroit Sportscar Challenge presented by Bosch. He led for most of his stint, giving up the lead only when blocked in heavy traffic. His stellar driving won him SPEEDtv.com’s ‘Drive of the Race,’ though the team had to settle for second place in the event. Sharp and Brabham were joined by Dario Franchitti, one of Sharp’s former IndyCar competitors, for the 10-hour Petit Le Mans endurance race.
Unfortunately, broken suspension took the car out of the race early on.

The combination of Sharp and Brabham proved formidable, yet bad luck kept Sharp and Brabham from winning the championship. The duo finished second in the P2 point standings, forty one points behind the Penske Racing duo of Timo Bernhard and Romain Dumas, after being as close as four points away with two rounds to go.

Extreme Speed Motorsports

It was announced on the American Le Mans Series website that Sharp would race in the 2010 series under his own team called Extreme Speed Motorsports. He ran with two Ferrari F430's in the GT class and was sponsored by the Patrón Spirits Company. Sharp raced in 2010 alongside the first announced driver, Patrón CEO Ed Brown.

In 2011, the team switched to Ferrari 458 Italia GT2 cars. The team made steady progress which culminated in a 3rd-place finish at the Laguna Seca race.

The team continued to run in the ALMS in 2013. The #02 car picked up another podium finish at the 2012 American Le Mans Series at Long Beach, and the #01 won the 2012 Grand Prix of Mosport, the first win for the team since its move to the GT class.

In 2016, Sharp won the Rolex 24 for the second time, this time with ESM.

Motorsports career results

SCCA National Championship Runoffs

American open-wheel
(key) (Races in bold indicate pole position)

CART

IndyCar Series

Indy 500 results

Touring/sports car racing

24 Hours of Le Mans results

American Le Mans Series results
(Races in bold indicate pole position)

* Overall victory as well as class victory.
Italics indicates season is currently running.

WeatherTech SportsCar Championship results
(key)(Races in bold indicate pole position, Results are overall/class)

NASCAR
(key) (Bold – Pole position awarded by qualifying time. Italics – Pole position earned by points standings or practice time. * – Most laps led.)

Winston Cup Series

Notes

References

External links
Extreme Speed Motorsports Official Website
Highcroft Racing Official Website
Patrón Racing Official Website

 

1968 births
Living people
Sportspeople from Norwalk, Connecticut
Racing drivers from Connecticut
24 Hours of Le Mans drivers
24 Hours of Daytona drivers
Indianapolis 500 drivers
Indianapolis 500 polesitters
American Le Mans Series drivers
Rolex Sports Car Series drivers
Trans-Am Series drivers
IndyCar Series champions
IndyCar Series drivers
Champ Car drivers
NASCAR drivers
International Race of Champions drivers
WeatherTech SportsCar Championship drivers
FIA World Endurance Championship drivers
SCCA National Championship Runoffs winners
12 Hours of Sebring drivers
Mo Nunn Racing drivers
A. J. Foyt Enterprises drivers
Rahal Letterman Lanigan Racing drivers
Panther Racing drivers
Extreme Speed Motorsports drivers
Highcroft Racing drivers
PacWest Racing drivers
Bettenhausen Racing drivers